"The Legend of Novgorode" was the first poem of Blaise Cendrars published in 1907.

History

Background
In 1904, Sauser went to Russia as an apprentice to a Swiss watchmaker. He would have written this poem in French in 1908, just after the death of a girl he loved since he began living in St. Petersburg in 1905. A librarian he knew, R. R., was supposed to have translated it into Russian, and the author claimed that fourteen copies were subsequently made. No copies could be found, not even in the author's possession.

"Rediscovery"
This text was considered for a long time as lost, or as a product of the author's imagination, until in 1995, Bulgarian writer  Kiril Kadiiski claimed to have discovered  a Russian copy in Sofia. After a raging controversy, this copy is now mostly considered as a fraud, with a very good impersonation of Cendrars' (writing at that time Frédéric Sauser) style. This first poem would have revealed the origins of the nickname that was chosen by Fréderic Sauser.

The authenticity of the document is still questionable today.

See also
 Modernism
 Forgery

References

Modernist poems
French poems